The Tongatapu by-election of 2005 was a by-election held to elect a new People's Representative to the Tongan Legislative Assembly. The vacancy occurred following the appointment of the incumbent, Feleti Sevele, to cabinet. The by-election was won by former Police Minister Clive Edwards.

 
 
 
 
 
 
 
 
 
 
 
 
 
 
 
 
 
 
 

Results from Matangi Tonga.

2005 elections in Oceania
2005 in Tonga
By-elections to the Legislative Assembly of Tonga
Tongatapu

pl:Wybory na Tonga w 2005 roku#Wybory uzupełniające